Mashiur Rahaman Ranga (born 22 July 1958) is a Bangladeshi politician who is the incumbent Jatiya Sangsad member from Rangpur-1 constituency. He served as secretary general of Jatiya Party as well as state minister of the Ministry of Local Government, Rural Development & Co-operatives.

Career 
Ranga is a transportation businessman. He was elected a member of parliament from the Rangpur-1 constituency in 2001, 2014 and 2018. In September 2022 he has been expelled from his party from all posts including the post of its presidium member.

References

1958 births
Living people
Awami League politicians
8th Jatiya Sangsad members
10th Jatiya Sangsad members
11th Jatiya Sangsad members
State Ministers of Local Government, Rural Development and Co-operatives